Sanza Pombo Airport  is a public use airport serving Sanza Pombo, a town in Uíge Province, Angola.

See also

 List of airports in Angola
 Transport in Angola

References

External links 
 OurAirports - Sanza Pombo
 OpenStreetMap - Sanza Pombo
 Google Maps 2007 image

Airports in Angola
Uíge Province